A Simple Heart can refer to:

 "A Simple Heart" (short story), an 1877 short story by Gustave Flaubert
 A Simple Heart (film), a 2008 French film based on the short story